Elliott Harcourt Montgomery (born November 3, 1961), known as Lee Montgomery, is a United States-based Canadian actor. He is best known for his role as a lonely little boy who befriends a pack of killer rats in the film Ben (1972) and as Sarah Jessica Parker's hunky dance partner, Jeff Malene, in Girls Just Want to Have Fun (1985).

Hollywood
Brother of actresses Belinda Montgomery and Tannis G. Montgomery, and the son of actor Cecil Montgomery, Lee began his career as a model before venturing into the acting business. He made his debut in the Disney film The Million Dollar Duck in 1971, before landing a starring role in Ben (1972), the sequel to Willard (1971). He played Billy Baker in Baker's Hawk (1976).

Montgomery played a dying boy in the Academy Award-nominated film Pete 'n' Tillie (1972). He made appearances on television series such as The Mod Squad, Columbo, The Streets of San Francisco, Kojak, Adam-12, Emergency!, Marcus Welby, M.D., and The Mary Tyler Moore Show.  He acted in the infamous incest-themed film called The Savage Is Loose (1974), and in the cult horror film Burnt Offerings (1976).

In the 1980s, Montgomery made more cameo appearances in television shows such as CHiPs, Family Ties, Hotel, Fame, and Dallas, and he made a transition to adult roles in films such as Split Image (1982), Night Shadows (aka Mutant) (1984) and Into the Fire (1988). One of his best known later roles was as Phil Grenville in The Midnight Hour (1985). He also played Jeff Malene in the teen comedy Girls Just Want to Have Fun  (1985), where he engages in a notable dance scene with co-star Sarah Jessica Parker. He appeared in a CBS Schoolbreak Special called "Hear Me Cry" (1984).

After Hollywood 
Since dropping out of the limelight, Montgomery pursued other interests, such as music related projects. He composed the soundtrack for the film Trigon: The Legend of Pelgidium (2000). Montgomery completely disappeared from public view for more than 20 years. At least part of that time, he was working for a marketing firm. Montgomery resurfaced around 2012, appearing at Monster-Mania Con 25 in 2016 and other horror-themed conventions, signing photos and posing for pictures with fans.

A new on-camera interview with Montgomery is featured on the 2015 re-issue DVD and Blu-ray of Burnt Offerings. In it, he discusses the making of the film, as well as other experiences during his time as an actor. , Montgomery is working as a full-time professional real estate agent in Solvang, California.

Selected filmography
1971: The Million Dollar Duck .... James "Jimmy" Dooley (first film role)
1972: Pete 'n' Tillie.......Robbie Seltzer
1972: Ben .... Daniel "Danny" Garrison
1973: Runaway! (TV movie) .... Mark Shedd
1974: Columbo: Mind Over Mayhem (TV movie) .... Steve Spelberg
1974: The Savage Is Loose .... Young David
1974: Adam-12 (TV Series, 2 Episodes) ....Greg Whitney
1976: Burnt Offerings .... David 'Davey' Rolf
1976: Baker's Hawk .... Billy Baker
1977: Dead of Night (TV movie) .... Bobby
1978: True Grit: A Further Adventure (TV movie) .... Daniel Sumner
1982: The Six of Us (TV movie) .... Sam Benjamin
1982: Split Image .... Walter
1983: Hotel (TV series) .... Eric Stevens
1984: Mutant .... Mike Cameron
1985: Prime Risk .... Michael Fox
1985: Girls Just Want to Have Fun .... Jeff Malene
1985: The Midnight Hour (TV movie) .... Phil Grenville
1988: Into the Fire .... Wade Burnett (final film role).

References

Bibliography
 Holmstrom, John. The Moving Picture Boy: An International Encyclopaedia from 1895 to 1995. Norwich, Michael Russell, 1996, p. 336-337.

External links
 
 
 Lee Montgomery, northernstars.ca; accessed October 15, 2017. 

Living people
American real estate businesspeople
American male film actors
Canadian male child actors
Canadian male film actors
Canadian emigrants to the United States
Male actors from Winnipeg
1961 births